Gibberula langostera is a species of very small sea snail, a marine gastropod mollusk or micromollusk in the family Cystiscidae.

Description

Distribution
They are only found off the coast of Cuba

References

Cystiscidae
Gastropods described in 2007